Peter Barker Howard May  (31 December 1929 – 27 December 1994) was an English cricketer who played for Surrey County Cricket Club, Cambridge University and England.  Already a cricketing prodigy during his school days, May played his entire cricket career as an amateur, and was regarded by many players and fans as England's finest batsman in the post-war era.

Described in his Wisden obituary as "tall and handsome with a batting style that was close to classical, and... the hero of a generation of school boys", May was made a Commander of the Order of the British Empire in 1981, and posthumously inducted into the ICC Cricket Hall of Fame in 2009.  Wisden Cricketer's Almanack described May as a "schoolboy prodigy" who went on to become "one of England’s finest batsmen".

Early career
Born in Reading, Berkshire, he was educated at Leighton Park junior school, Charterhouse and Pembroke College, Cambridge, and at both he was regarded as a batting prodigy. Across the 1950s, he was the most consistent and prolific English batsman in both county (representing Surrey) and Test cricket. He made his Test match debut against South Africa at Headingley in 1951, scoring 138, and was then a regular England player until forced out by illness in the early 1960s. May was one of the Wisden Cricketers of the Year in 1952. May was the natural successor to Leonard Hutton as England captain after the successful defence of the Ashes on the 1954–55 tour of Australia.

Captaincy

May enjoyed a largely successful captaincy of both his county and country. Surrey had been County Champions for seven years running, with May the captain for the last two seasons, and until 1958 England was never defeated under his leadership. He had beaten South Africa 3–2 in 1955, considered by many to have been the most exciting Test series since the war, Australia 2–1 in 1956, the West Indies 3–0 in 1957 and New Zealand 4–0 in 1958. He was widely regarded as the best post-war batsman England produced, tall, strong and disciplined with a near-perfect technique, a straight bat and a complete range of strokes. His standards improved with the responsibilities of captaincy and his Test average as captain was 54.03. His highest score was at Edgbaston in 1957, when England trailed West Indies by 288 runs in the first innings; he made 285 not out, the highest score by an England captain until Graham Gooch's 333 in 1990, adding 411 with Colin Cowdrey (154) – still an England record for any wicket – and destroyed the mesmerising hold the spinner Sonny Ramadhin had over English batsmen. In the low scoring Ashes series of 1956 he had made 453 runs (90.60) and was out only once for less than 50, when he made 43. Although himself a highly educated amateur and a gentleman he realised that the old class divisions in English cricket were breaking down and under Len Hutton's leadership the amateur and professional had merged. He enjoyed the complete loyalty of the team and the selectors and was ready to help his players and smooth down feathers. As a captain he was a strict team disciplinarian who expected high standards, he was ruthless when the occasion demanded, but could be inflexible and unimaginative and lacked the charisma of a natural leader. In 1958–59 he played too defensively and surrendered the initiative too readily to Richie Benaud and he concentrated on saving runs instead of trying to get batsmen out. Faced with Ian Meckiff's questionable bowling, in the disastrous First Test, he declined to make an official complaint as he believed it would appear unsporting. Meckiff was, in fact, several years later, called for an illegal bowling action, ending his career. After the Australian tour May beat New Zealand 1–0, India 5–0 and led England to its first series victory in the West Indies 1–0. He lost 2–1 to the 1961 Australians and retired due to ill-health having been captain in a then record 41 Tests (20 wins, 10 defeats and 11 draws), Benaud being the only man to defeat him in a Test series. He retired entirely from first-class cricket in 1963, taking up a post in the City with the insurance brokerage Willis Faber Dumas; now Willis Group.

Cricket administrator
May succeeded Alec Bedser as Chairman of the England cricket selectors in 1982 and held the post for seven years, including presiding over the notorious 1988 Summer of four captains.  He served as President of the Marylebone Cricket Club and posthumously as President of Surrey County Cricket Club from 1995 to 1996.

Personal life
In 1959, May married Virginia Gilligan, a daughter of the former England captain Harold Gilligan and they had four daughters. 
May died at Liphook, Hampshire, from a brain tumour on 27 December 1994, four days before what would have been his 65th birthday.

Miscellaneous
Peter May served his National Service in the Writer branch of the Royal Navy.
May has a stand named after him (the 'Peter May Enclosure') at the Oval, Surrey, England.
Peter May was also an outstanding Eton Fives player, winning the Kinnaird Cup (effectively the national championship) three years running (from 1951 to 1953), partnered by his brother, J.W.H. May. As a pair, the May brothers were never defeated.
May is mentioned in the Peter Hammill song "(No More) The Sub-Mariner", from the 1974 album, In Camera.

References

Bibliography

External links

 

1929 births
1994 deaths
Military personnel from Reading, Berkshire
20th-century Royal Navy personnel
Royal Navy sailors
England Test cricketers
England Test cricket captains
Cricketers who made a century on Test debut
English cricketers
English cricketers of 1946 to 1968
Surrey cricket captains
Surrey cricketers
Wisden Cricketers of the Year
Wisden Leading Cricketers in the World
Cambridge University cricketers
Combined Services cricketers
Commanders of the Order of the British Empire
Presidents of the Marylebone Cricket Club
Presidents of Surrey County Cricket Club
Sportspeople from Reading, Berkshire
People educated at Charterhouse School
Alumni of Pembroke College, Cambridge
Deaths from brain cancer in England
England cricket team selectors
Berkshire cricketers
Marylebone Cricket Club cricketers
Gentlemen cricketers
English amateur cricketers
Gentlemen of England cricketers
T. N. Pearce's XI cricketers